Simon-Pierre Diamond (born February 9, 1985) is a politician in Quebec, Canada. He represented the Marguerite-D'Youville district in the National Assembly of Quebec from 2007 to 2008 as a member of the Action démocratique du Québec.

From 2004 to 2007, Diamond, a law student at Université de Montréal and a resident of Boucherville, served as President of the Youth Commission of the ADQ.  He supports same-sex marriage, but believes that only the federal government has jurisdiction over that issue.

In the 2007 election at age 22, Diamond became the youngest member ever elected to the Quebec legislature, a record he held until the 2012 election of Léo Bureau-Blouin; the previous recordholders had been André Boisclair and Claude Charron.

Diamond was elected with 37% of the vote, defeating PQ candidate Sébastien Gagnon (31%) and Liberal incumbent Pierre Moreau (27%). He took office on April 12, 2007.  On April 19, 2007, he was selected to be the Official Opposition's Shadow Minister of Environment and Sustaining Development.  He lost his seat in the 2008 election along with 33 other ADQ MNAs, coming in third place in his riding with 18.46% of the vote.

On May 31, 2010, it was announced Diamond had switched to the Liberal Party and would be running for them in the July 5 Vachon by-election. He was defeated in that election by Parti Québécois candidate Martine Ouellet.

Diamond was born in Boucherville, Quebec. His father is a federal Liberal.

Electoral record

Source: Official Results, Le Directeur général des élections du Québec.

|-

|Liberal
|Jean-Robert Grenier
|align="right"|13,119
|align="right"|35.88
|align="right"|+8.68

|-

|-

|}

|-

|Liberal
|Pierre Moreau
|align="right"|11,401
|align="right"|27.20
|align="right"|-14.18
|-

|}
* Increase is from UFP

External links 
 
 Political rookie makes history in Quebec

Footnotes

1985 births
Action démocratique du Québec MNAs
Living people
People from Boucherville
Place of birth missing (living people)
Quebec Liberal Party candidates in Quebec provincial elections
21st-century Canadian politicians